Eucereon quadricolor is a moth of the subfamily Arctiinae. It was described by Francis Walker in 1855. It is found in Mexico, Costa Rica, Panama and Rio de Janeiro, Brazil.

References

quadricolor
Moths described in 1855